William Timothy Jones (born December 1, 1962, in Sumter, South Carolina) is an American former professional baseball infielder.  He is an alumnus of The Citadel.

Drafted by the St. Louis Cardinals in the 2nd round of the 1985 Major League Baseball Draft, Jones made his Major League Baseball debut with the St. Louis Cardinals on July 26, 1988, and appeared in his final game during on October 2, 1993.

External links

1962 births
Living people
American expatriate baseball players in Canada
Arkansas Travelers players
Baseball players from South Carolina
Charlotte Knights players
Edmonton Trappers players
Johnson City Cardinals players
Louisville Redbirds players
Major League Baseball second basemen
Major League Baseball shortstops
Major League Baseball third basemen
Sportspeople from Sumter, South Carolina
St. Louis Cardinals players
St. Petersburg Cardinals players
The Citadel Bulldogs baseball players